Kury was a Polish rock group. The band was founded in 1992 by Ryszard Tymon Tymański. Kury played experimental rock music and their style evolved in time towards a more electronic direction. Their album P.O.L.O.V.I.R.U.S., released in 1998, was a fictional compilation of pastiche songs deriding the condition of Polish popular music. After Jacek Olter's suicide in January 2001, the band continued its activity playing concerts with Jacek Stromski, Rory Walsh and Kuba Staruszkiewicz on drums. The last concert was in December 2003, after which Tymański disbanded the group. The last album containing live recordings entitled Martwe gitary was due to be released in 2008 but never did. In 2011 and 2012 the band played a couple of concerts.

P.O.L.O.V.I.R.U.S. won a 1998 Fryderyk for Album of the Year – Alternative. Their song "Jesienna deprecha" from that album was nominated for song of the year. The band also got nominations for group of the year and video of the year.

Members
 Ryszard Tymon Tymański – bass guitar, voice
 Jacek Olter – drums
 Piotr Pawlak – guitar
 Anna Lasocka
 Jerzy Mazzoll Mazolewski

Discography
 Kablox-niesłyna histaria (1995)
 P.O.L.O.V.I.R.U.S. (1998)
 Na żywo w Pstrągu (1999)
 Napijmy się oleju  (EP, 2000)
 100 lat undergroundu (2001)

References

Polish alternative rock groups